The Dawson Bridge is a two lane bridge that spans the North Saskatchewan River in Edmonton, Alberta, Canada.

In early 2010, it underwent repairs, and later reopened on December 20, 2010.

Dawson Bridge connects the communities of Forest Heights on the east end to Riverdale on the west end.

See also 
 List of crossings of the North Saskatchewan River
 List of bridges in Canada

References

Bridges in Edmonton
Road bridges in Alberta